Nuno Gomes Nabiam (born 17 November 1966) is a Bissau-Guinean politician who has been the Prime Minister of Guinea-Bissau since 28 February 2020. He is a political scientist and military officer who previously served as President of Guinea-Bissau acting between 1 June 2021 and 15 June 2021.
 On 29 April 2020, he and three ministers tested positive for COVID-19.

Education
Gomes Nabiam graduated from Kwame Nkrumah National High School. He completed his degree at the Higher Institute of Civil Aviation Engineering in Kyiv, Ukraine, and was awarded a Civil Aviation Scholarship in 1986. Gomes Nabiam later studied in the United States, where he obtained a master's degree in business management.

Political career
Gomes Nabiam became an activist in the African Youth Amílcar Cabral in 1978. In 1980, he became a militant in the PAIGC party. In 2012, he was appointed chairman of the board of directors of the Guinea-Bissau Civil Aviation Agency by the Bissau-Guinean government.

On 28 February 2020, Gomes Nabiam was appointed Prime Minister of Guinea-Bissau. He is a member of the Assembly of the People United political party. He is a political scientist and military officer who previously served as Acting President of Guinea-Bissau between 1 June 2021 and 15 June 2021.

References

1966 births
Living people
Prime Ministers of Guinea-Bissau